The Cape of Rodon or Cape of Skanderbeg ( or Kepi i Skenderbeut) is a rocky cape on the Adriatic Sea north of Durrës, Albania. On the Cape is the Rodoni Castle, built by Skanderbeg in 1463. and a Saint Anthony Church. Further south in the bay between the cape and Rrushkull Reserve there exist several beach resorts like Fshati Turistik Lura while Lalzit Bay Resort is under construction.

Name
The name Redon appears in ancient inscriptions found in Santa Maria di Leuca (present-day Lecce), and on coins minted by the Illyrian city of Lissos, suggesting that he was worshipped as the guardian deity of the city, and probably as a sea god. The fact that Redon was always depicted on coins wearing a petasos demonstrates a connection with travelling and sailing, which led historians to the conclusion that Redon was the deity protector of travellers and sailors. Indeed, the inscriptions of Santa Maria di Leuca were carved by the crews of two Roman merchant ships manned by Illyrians. Inscriptions mentioning Redon were also found on coins from the Illyrian cities of Daorson and Scodra, and even in archaeological findings from Dyrrhachium after the establishment of a Roman colony there. His name keeps on being used in the Albanian Kepi i Rodonit, which could be analysed as an Illyrian sanctuary dedicated to the god of the sailors in the past.

See also 
 
 Albanian Adriatic Sea Coast  
 Biodiversity of Albania
 Geography of Albania
 Protected areas of Albania

Sources

Citations

Bibliography

Bays of Albania
Headlands of Albania
Bays of the Mediterranean
Bodies of water of Albania
Albanian Adriatic Sea Coast
Illyrian Albania